A Pit Boy's Romance is a 1917 British silent drama film directed by A.E. Coleby and Arthur Rooke and starring Jimmy Wilde, Tommy Noble and Arthur Rooke. The film ends with the villain's protégé losing a boxing match to the hero, a plot similar to that of Coleby's film of the previous year Kent, the Fighting Man.

References

Bibliography
 Low, Rachael. The History of British Film: Volume III, 1914-1918. Routledge, 2001.

External links

1917 films
1917 drama films
British silent feature films
British drama films
Films directed by Arthur Rooke
British black-and-white films
1910s English-language films
1910s British films
Silent drama films